Genareh (also Romanized as Genāreh; also known as Genāreh-ye Malek) is a village in Qoroq Rural District, Baharan District, Gorgan County, Golestan Province, Iran. At the 2006 census, its population was 229, in 52 families.

References 

Populated places in Gorgan County